Dhani Charan is a village located in the Malsisar Tehsil of Jhunjhunu district, Rajasthan, India. It have total population of 687 and area of 2.87 km2. Dhani Charan is associated with villages Panchayat Birmi and Malsisar Tehsil . It lies under the legislative assembly seat of Mandawa and loksabha seat of Jhunjhunu. The current MP is Narendra Khichar. The nearest airports are Bhiwani at 100 km, Jaipur at 197 km and Delhi airport at 254 km .

References 

Villages in Jhunjhunu district